X28 may refer to:

X.28, ITU-T standard specifying the interface between asynchronous character-mode data terminal equipment (DTE), such as computer terminals, and a Packet Assembler/Disassembler (PAD) that connects the DTE to a packet switched network such as an X.25 network
X-28 or Osprey Osprey I, a single-seat flying boat
X28 (New York City bus)